Belle Isle Castle is an 18th century house on Belle Isle, an island previously known, in Gaelic times, as Ballymacmanus Island or Senadh-Mic-Maghnusa or, simply, Senad. The Belle Isle Estate stretches over 470-acres near Lisbellaw in County Fermanagh, Northern Ireland. Built solely as a house in the early 17th century, Belle Isle Castle is now expanded and fully refurbished and serves as a popular tourist attraction, hotel and wedding venue. It also contains an on site cookery school. Dating back to the early 17th century, the estate has been inhabited, owned and expanded by generations of nobles including The 1st Earl of Ross. The estate has welcomed the public since 1760 when it began hosting events. In 1991, the castle was fully refurbished to open its doors to more visitors. The castle contains a gallery, an overlook tower, a courtyard, and a grand banquet hall.  It also offers different residences throughout its coach houses and cottages, all of which include unique, different style bedrooms for its guests. The estate encompasses English and Irish furnishings, a grand open fireplace, works by Russian, Irish and English painters, and floor-to-ceiling windows that overlook the garden, which has been manifesting since the 18th century.

History 
Belle Isle Castle originated as a sole house that was first built and inhabited by Sir Ralph Gore, 4th Bt., in about 1700, after his grandfather Sir Paul Gore came into possession of Belle Island. Sir Ralph Gore’s grandson, also named Sir Ralph Gore, was born in the house in 1725 and throughout his life further expanded it, adding cottages, a tower, and with the help of designer Thomas Wright, together created the magnificent garden that surrounds the estate and extends to the Lough Erne shore. Upon Gore’s death in 1801, the now expanded castle was left to his only surviving child, Lady Mary Hardinge, wife of Sir Richard Hardinge, 1st Baronet.

After Lady Hardinge’s death in 1824, and her husband’s death two years later, the estate was left to the nephew of Hardinge, The Rev. Sir Charles Hardinge, 2nd Baronet, of Tonbridge, Kent, whom deemed no interest in owning the castle.
 In 1830, he sold the estate for £68,000 to The Rev. John Grey Porter of Kilskeery, whose descendants owned the property up until 1991. During the ownership, the Porters worked to further expand the castle, adding various office wings and cottage houses. In 1991, Porter descendant Miss Lavinia Baird sold the estate to The 5th Duke of Abercorn, who purchased the estate for his youngest son, Lord Nicholas Hamilton. It was the dedicated and admirable work of the Abercorns that have vividly transformed the castle into the fully functioning tourist attraction it is today.

Grounds 
Situated behind the castle, the Belle Isle Cookery School opened its doors in 2004 to be the first state-of-the-art cookery school in Northern Ireland.

Also on the grounds are activities available to guests that include shooting, sailing, and hiking.

See also
 Castles in Northern Ireland

References

Castles in County Fermanagh